She Says may refer to:
 "She Says" (Howie Day song), 2005
 "She Says" (Unwritten Law song), 2005
 She Says (album), a 2011 album by JJ Lin